William Casey (1932 – 3 December 2016) was an Irish Gaelic footballer. His league and championship career at senior level with the Mayo county team spanned thirteen seasons from 1951 to 1964.

Casey first came to prominence on the inter-county scene at the age of eighteen when he was a key member of the Mayo junior team. He won an All-Ireland medal in 1951 before being promoted to the senior grade the following year. Casey made his debut during the 1951-52 league. Over the course of the next thirteen seasons he became a regular member of the starting fifteen and won one Connacht medal and one National Football League medal as a member of the extended panel. He played his last game for Mayo in July 1964.

Career statistics

References

 sub

1932 births
2016 deaths
Ballina Stephenites Gaelic footballers
Mayo inter-county Gaelic footballers
People from Ballina, County Mayo